Egrid (or Egfried) was launched at Shields in 1810. She was initially a London-based transport but then after the British East India Company in 1813 lost its monopoly on the trade between Britain and the East Indies started trading with India. Egfrid put into St Helena in September 1821 leaky and was condemned there and her cargo transshipped on another vessel.

Career
Egfrid first appeared in Lloyd's Register (LR) in 1810 as "Elfrid" with G. Taylor, master, and Templer, owner. Lloyd's Register still carried the Elfrid name in 1811, but with unchanging data. It also carried the Egfrid.

Fate
Egfrid, Brown, master, arrived at Bengal from London and Mauritius prior to 9 December 1820.

She left Bengal and put into Mauritius from where she was expected to sail on 1 May 1821. She then sailed to the Cape of Good Hope and arrived there leaky on 4 July. It was expected that she would have to discharge part of her cargo to repair, and then would sail for London in the first week of August.

She sailed for England but had to put into St Helena on 22 August, leaky.

Egfrid was surveyed and condemned as a constructive total loss on 28 September.  She was then sold at public auction on 23 October for breaking up.

Centurion, Meade, master, sailed from St Helena on 29 September and arrived at Deal on 4 December, with Egfrids cargo.

Citations

References

1810 ships
Ships built by Temple shipbuilders
Age of Sail merchant ships of England
Maritime incidents in September 1821